The Central Penn Capitals (formerly the York Capitals) were a professional indoor football team based in Harrisburg, Pennsylvania. The Capitals played as members of American Indoor Football (AIF) from 2013 to 2016. The club was established in 2012 as an expansion team for the 2013 season when Jim Morris secured the rights to an AIF franchise in York, Pennsylvania at the York City Ice Arena. The team relocated to Harrisburg for the 2016 season with home games played at the Pennsylvania Farm Show Complex & Expo Center. The AIF ceased operations after the 2016 season and the Capitals did not join another league.

The Capitals were York's first indoor/arena football team. They were Harrisburg's second such team, the first being the Harrisburg Stampede, which played in the AIF (and its predecessors the AIFA and SIFL) from 2009 until 2013 before moving to Hershey and the Professional Indoor Football League the following season.

Franchise history

In October 2012, it was announced that York, Pennsylvania had been awarded an expansion franchise of American Indoor Football (AIF). The franchise announced the following week that they would be holding a name-the-team contest open to York fans. The finalist of the team names came out to "Capitals", "Patriots", "Renegades", "Independence" and "Colonials", with Capitals gaining 49.2% of the votes to be the official nickname. The team's name refers to the city's colonial heritage, with the Continental Congress having completed the final draft of the Articles of Confederation while it met in York during ten months of the Revolutionary War. York is thus considered one of the first capitals of the United States.

The team introduced its first four players during a news conference on December 5, 2012: Rafael Cooper (running back), Thomas Potts (linebacker), Archie Smith (defensive back/wide receiver), and Keith Stokes (wide receiver).

After the Capitals opened play with a 32–25 victory over the Washington Eagles, York battled to a 5–4 regular season record, securing a playoff spot. The Capitals faced in-state rival, the Harrisburg Stampede, with a chance to advance to the AIF Championship Game. The Stampede rallied in the 4th quarter with 17 points to win 51–41, ending the Capitals season.

For the 2014 season, the Capitals announced that Matt Steeple would coach the team.

On July 15, 2014, it was announced that Isaac Carn had purchased the Capitals from Jim Morris. Carn promptly named Eric Dorsey II the team's new coach, though Rick Marsilio was named the head coach before the season started. Marsilio was an assistant for the now defunct Harrisburg Stampede, and recruited multiple Stampede players to the Capitals. The recruiting helped, as the Capitals finished the regular season 8–0, clinching the 1 seed in the 2015 AIF Playoffs. The Capitals defeated the ASI Panthers 68–58 to clinch a berth in the 2015 AIF Championship Game against the Chicago Blitz. The Capitals defeated the Blitz 58–30, capturing their first-ever championship.

On October 14, 2015, it was announced that the Capitals were moving to Harrisburg and renaming themselves the Central Penn Capitals. The Capitals would finish fourth in the Northern Division after the regular season due to the folding of the Philadelphia Yellow Jackets, thereby qualifying for a playoff spot. However, after being announced as playing the West Michigan Ironmen in the division semifinals, they were removed from the schedule and replaced with the Southern Division's third place team, the Myrtle Beach Freedom. No statements from the team or league were made addressing the removal of the Capitals. At the conclusion of the 2016 season, the AIF ceased operations. The Capitals website was taken down during the summer of 2016 indicating they had ceased operations as well.

Final roster

Awards and honors
The following is a list of all Capitals players who won league awards:

All-League players
The following Capitals players have been named to All-League Teams:
 QB E. J. Nemeth (1)
 FB Sarron Anderson (1)
 WR Julius Gregory (1), Rob Jones (1), Rob Wright (1)
 OL Steven Brazzle (1), Jason Townsend (1), Victor Sesay (1)
 LB Chindy Agugua (1), Michael Woodhouse (1), Jermaine Thaxton (1), Bryant Lewis (1), Will Hines (1)
 DB Archie Smith (1), Armar Watson (1), James Pitts (1), Travis Proctor (1)

Coaches of note

Head coaches

Coaching staff

Season-by-season results

References

External links
 

 
2012 establishments in Pennsylvania
2016 disestablishments in Pennsylvania